Srikanth or Sreekanth is a common Indian first name.

 Srikanth (Tamil actor, born 1940), Tamil film actor active in films from 1965
 Srikanth (Tamil actor, born 1980), Tamil actor active in films after 2002
 Srikanth (Telugu actor), Telugu actor who debuted in films in 1991
Srikanth Iyengar, Telugu actor who acted in 2010s
Krishnamachari Srikkanth, Indian cricketer